I Don't Believe We've Met is the second studio album by American country music singer Danielle Bradbery. It was released on December 1, 2017. The album title, cover, and track listing were revealed on August 4, 2017. According to Bradbery, the album serves as her "reintroduction" into the music world, for it had been four years since the release of her debut album, in 2013.

Commercial performance
The album debuted at No. 41 on Billboard 200, No. 6 on Top Country Albums, selling 11,100 copies (15,000 album-equivalent units) in the first week. As of March 2018, the album has sold 21,900 copies in the United States.

Critical reception

Allmusic reviewer Stephen Thomas Erlewine wrote that "her sophomore album fits into the fluid musical landscape of 2017, adding in hefty doses of electronics, shades of soul, and the occasional retro flashback." Laura Hostelley of Sounds Like Nashville spoke about the album "No longer bounded by traditional country, she experiments with pop and R&B tones to create her own sound."

Rolling Stone praised the album, with writer Luke Levenson commenting, "With crisp production overseen by songwriter Josh Kerr and confessional lyrics, I Don't Believe We've Met challenges any notion people had of the wide-eyed, Blake Shelton-coached ingénue from four years ago."

Singles
The album's lead single, "Sway", was released on June 2, 2017. The single impacted country radio on August 28, 2017. "Worth It" was made available to radio on February 26, 2018, and officially impacted on March 5, 2018 as the second official single. These singles peaked at number 47 and 46 on the Billboard Country Airplay chart, respectively. "Sway" also reached the Top 40 of the Billboard Hot Country Songs chart.

A remixed version of "Hello Summer" featuring Thomas Rhett, entitled "Goodbye Summer", was released digitally on August 3, 2018. It was serviced to country radio as the album's third single on August 27, 2018, and reached a peak of number 39 on the Billboard Country Airplay chart, making it her first Top 40 hit on the chart since her debut single, "The Heart of Dixie," in 2013.

Promotional singles
The album's first promotional single, "Human Diary," was released on August 11, 2017, along with an "instant grat" music video. "Hello Summer," "Potential," and "Worth It" were released as additional promotional singles on September 22, October 20, and November 10, respectively.

Track listing

Personnel
Adapted from I Don't Believe We've Met liner notes.

Danielle Bradbery – lead vocals, background vocals
Julian Bunetta – electric guitar, bass, keyboards, drums, background vocals
Dave Cohen – keyboards
David Davidson – strings
Hannah Ellis – background vocals 
Sam Ellis – acoustic guitar, keyboards, programming, background vocals
Conni Ellisor – strings
Ian Franzino – keyboards, programming, background vocals
Andrew Haas – acoustic guitar, bass, electric guitar, keyboards, programming, background vocals
Mark Hill – bass
Evan Hutchings – drums
Jason Gantt – acoustic guitar, bass, electric guitar, keyboards, programming, 
Jaren Johnston – acoustic guitar
Steph Jones – background vocals
Josh Kerr – acoustic guitar, electric guitar, steel guitar, bass, keyboards, programming, background vocals
Tony Lucido – bass
Rob McNelley – electric guitar
Carl Miner – acoustic guitar
Jordan Minton – background vocals
Garrett Perales – electric guitar
Jordan Reynolds – background vocals 
Carole N. Rabinowitz – strings
Jerry Roe – drums
John Ryan – electric guitar
Mark Trussell – electric guitar
Alysa Vanderheym – acoustic guitar, keyboards, programming
Nick Wayne – background vocals
Emily Weisband – background vocals
Derek Wells – electric guitar
Kristen Wilkinson – strings

Chart performance

Album

Singles

References

2017 albums
Danielle Bradbery albums
Big Machine Records albums